The 1969 South American Championships in Athletics  were held in Quito, Ecuador, between 4 and 12 October.

Medal summary

Men's events

Women's events

Medal table

A = affected by altitude

External links
 Men Results – GBR Athletics
 Women Results – GBR Athletics
 Medallists

S
South American Championships in Athletics
1969 in South American sport
International athletics competitions hosted by Ecuador
Olymp
October 1969 sports events in South America